Logical Methods in Computer Science (LMCS) is a peer-reviewed open access scientific journal covering theoretical computer science and applied logic. It opened to submissions on September 1, 2004. The editor-in-chief is Stefan Milius (Friedrich-Alexander Universität Erlangen-Nürnberg).

History 

The journal was initially published by the International Federation
for Computational Logic, and then by a dedicated non-profit. The first editor-in-chief was Dana Scott. In its first year, the journal received 75 submissions.

Abstracting and indexing
The journal is abstracted and indexed in Current Contents/Engineering, Computing & Technology, Mathematical Reviews, Science Citation Index Expanded, Scopus, and Zentralblatt MATH. According to the Journal Citation Reports, the journal has a 2016 impact factor of 0.661.

References

External links

Publications established in 2005
Computer science journals
Open access journals
Logic journals
Logic in computer science
Formal methods publications
Quarterly journals
English-language journals